Transactions of the Philological Society is a linguistics journal published three times a year by Wiley-Blackwell on behalf of the Philological Society. It has appeared since 1854, making it the oldest scholarly linguistics journal. It is currently edited by Lutz Marten (SOAS University of London); Frans Plank and Nigel Vincent act as consulting editors.

Next to the journal itself, an associated series of monographs is published, which is edited by Melanie Green.

Indexing and Abstracting
The Transactions are abstracted and indexed, among others, in the following indices and bibliographies:
Academic Search
Arts and Humanities Citation Index
MLA International Bibliography
Periodicals Index Online
Web of Science

Monograph Series Publications of the Philological Society
As of 1 November 2022, the most recent titles published in this series are:
 (PPhS vol. 53)
 (PPhS vol. 52)
 (PPhS vol. 51)
 (PPhS vol. 50)
 (PPhS vol. 49)
 (PPhS vol. 48)
 (PPhS vol. 47)

References

External links
 Transactions at Wiley-Blackwell
 Transactions at the Philological Society site

Philology journals
Publications established in 1854